Rachel Talbot Ross is an American politician and activist. A Democrat from Portland, Talbot has been the Speaker of the Maine House of Representatives since December 2022. When she was first elected to the Maine House of Representatives in 2016, Talbot Ross became the first Black woman to serve in the Maine Legislature. Talbot Ross represents District 40, consisting of the Parkside, Bayside, East Bayside, and Oakdale neighborhoods of Portland as well as the University of Southern Maine campus. She became Maine's first African-American House Speaker, and the highest-ranking African-American politician in Maine history, when she was elected speaker on December 7, 2022.

Early life and education
Talbot Ross grew up in Portland with her father, Gerald Talbot, her mother Anita, and three sisters. Her father, who also served as a Maine lawmaker and civil rights leader, was the first person of color ever elected to the Maine Legislature, and Talbot Ross describes her family as being consistently involved in public service and civic action. She is a ninth-generation Maine resident.

Talbot Ross attended Wesleyan University and American University and worked as the Director of Equal Opportunity and Multicultural Affairs for the City of Portland for 21 years. She resigned in 2015 following a leave of absence.

She also served as the president of the Portland branch of the NAACP. The branch disbanded in 2013, but as of February 2021 Talbot Ross was working with other area leaders to reinstate the chapter. She also helped direct the Maine Freedom Trails project, the first part of which opened in 2006, and co-founded the Martin Luther King Jr. Fellows program with Portland city councilor Pious Ali, a youth-led racial justice program for high school students of color in Portland.

Talbot Ross considers herself a prison abolitionist and has advocated for incarcerated individuals in Maine over the course of fifteen years.

Political career

Talbot Ross was first elected to represent Maine House District 40 in 2016. She defeated Democrats Herbert Adams and Anna Kellar in the Democratic primary, and after Republican opponent Carol Taylor dropped out of the race in late September, Talbot Ross received 100% of the votes in the general election.

In 2018, Talbot Ross was challenged in the House District 40 Democratic primary by former state representative Herb Adams, but defeated him 75%-25%. She faced no opponent in the general election and was therefore seated for a second term.

Talbot Ross faced no opponents in either the primary or general elections in 2020. On November 3, 2020, she won her third consecutive term representing House District 40. Later that month, the House Democrats unanimously elected Talbot Ross to be the House assistant majority leader, making her the first Black person in a legislative leadership position in Maine history.

Talbot Ross has served on the Judiciary, Health & Human Services, and Criminal Justice & Public Safety committees, as well as the Maine State Advisory Committee for the U.S. Commission on Civil Rights. She is the chair of the Permanent Commission on the Status of Racial, Indigenous and Maine Tribal Population, which she helped write legislation to create in 2019, and is currently a member of the Legislative Council.

The 130th Maine legislature took up a bill proposed by Talbot Ross, "LD #2: An Act To Require the Inclusion of Racial Impact Statements in the Legislative Process," early in the regular session. It passed both the House and Senate on March 12, 2021, and on March 17,  Governor Janet Mills signed it into law. The bill requires that new legislation in Maine be reviewed for its potential impact on traditionally marginalized populations. With the law's enactment, Maine became the eighth U.S. state with such a requirement.

With incumbent Speaker Ryan Fecteau term-limited, the Maine Democrats nominated Talbot Ross as Speaker on November 18, 2022. When the new legislature was sworn in on December 7, she was elected Speaker.

Awards and honors
2006 EqualityMaine Bayard Rustin award for collaborative movement-building
2009 Roger Baldwin award, Maine Civil Liberties Union
2014 Deborah Morton Award, University of New England
2020 Gerda Haas award from the Holocaust and Human Rights Center of Maine for work on human rights reforms
2020 Emerge Maine Woman of the Year

Electoral history

Notes

References

External links

Rep. Talbot Ross on Facebook
Rep. Talbot Ross on Twitter
June 3 speech, "Your statement of support is not enough", given at a protest in Portland, ME on June 3, 2020
March 2019 Maine Public panel interview about hate, prejudice and discrimination in Maine

1961 births
Living people
21st-century African-American women
21st-century African-American politicians
African-American state legislators in Maine
African-American women in politics
Women state legislators in Maine
Politicians from Portland, Maine
Activists from Portland, Maine
Maine Democrats
NAACP activists
21st-century American politicians
21st-century American women politicians
Prison abolitionists
20th-century African-American politicians
20th-century American politicians
20th-century African-American women